In Blue is the second album released by The Static Jacks. The album was released on October 1, 2013 in the United States of America on Old Friends Records.

"I'll Come Back" was released as a free download through Rolling Stone's website on June 28, 2013. The music video for "I'll Come Back" premiered on July 23, 2013.
The next song to be released was "Wallflowers" on August 8 with the music video premiering on September 18.

Track listing

Release history

References

2013 albums
The Static Jacks albums